Cadishead is a village  in the City of Salford in Greater Manchester, England, with a population of 10,739 in 2014. Within the historic county of Lancashire.

History
The earliest record of Cadishead date to 1212, and show that the whole of Cadishead – then called Cadewalesate – was rented from King John by Gilbert Notton for four shillings (20p) a year, a sum equivalent to about £650 today. The name derives from the Old English words wælla and set, and Cada, a personal name; it means the "dwelling or fold by the stream of a man called Cada".

Until the early 19th century most of the area was part of the peat bog known as Chat Moss, but by 1805 work had started to reclaim the land. The opening of the Manchester Ship Canal in 1894 had a major effect on the subsequent development of Cadishead.

Governance 

Cadishead is represented in Westminster by Barbara Keeley MP for Worsley and Eccles South.

Councillors 

Until 2021 the area was represented on Salford City Council by three councillors serving the ward of Cadishead.

 indicates seat up for re-election.

Boundary changes coming in to effect at the 2021 Salford City Council election abolished the Cadishead ward and the Cadishead and Lower Irlam ward was created in its place.

Location
Cadishead is between Irlam and Rixton, on Liverpool Road (B5320) next to the Manchester Ship Canal and the M62 motorway, close to the border between Greater Manchester and Warrington.

Industry
The Northbank Industrial Park dominates the east of Cadishead and the border with Irlam and supplies many jobs to the local area.

Notable people
Ray Lowry was a painter and cartoonist originally from Cadishead. He created the London Calling album cover for the Clash.

Transport
Cadishead was once served by its own railway station. The station closed in November 1964 as part of the Beeching cuts which affected many railway stations in the UK at the time.

References

Notes

Bibliography

External links

Irlam and Cadishead Local History Society
St. Mary the Virgin C of E parish church

Geography of Salford
Salford City Council Wards